The Biographical Dictionary of British Quakers in Commerce and Industry, 1775–1920, by Edward H. Milligan, includes entries for some 2,800 people, arranged alphabetically. The last page is numbered 606.

Author
The author is the former Librarian and Archivist of Meeting for Sufferings (the executive committee) of Britain Yearly Meeting (the central national body), who was responsible for the Library at Friends House, London and the co-operative biography project with two Quaker colleges in the United States. The author received the 2009 Besterman/McColvin Award for this work.

Indices
The work includes the following indices:
Illustrations (copious black and white)
Occupations
Places (Arranged by County and Town)
Apprentice masters
Schools attended

Other introductory and explanatory matter

The prelims (xviii pages) 
Prologue
The Quaker background
Entry arrangement (a somewhat lengthy explanation, but highly relevant) 
Abbreviations.

The appendices 
The Quaker calendar
Editions of the Book of Discipline of London Yearly Meeting/Britain Yearly Meeting.
Queries and general advices
Regional and local area structure
Census of attendance at Meetings 1851
York apprentices
Friends Provident directors: an outsider's view
Glossary (Mini-essays on 50 Quakerese terms and issues, such as the Beacon Controversy, The Contagious Diseases Acts, Disownment, the Manchester Difficulty, Plain Dress, Women's Meetings . . .
Bibliography
Epilogue (which envisages the setting up of a revision committee for this work).

See also
History of the Quakers

The entries
The Dictionary shows many kinship groups active in commerce and industry. It shows the female children of each subject, if they married a male who is also a subject. An example of kinship is the entries for people called "Fox":

Albert (1836-1867), Kingsbridge
Alfred (1794-1874), Falmouth
Alfred Lloyd (1829-1885), Falmouth
Arthur Edward (1864-1940), Falmouth
Charles (1797-1878), Falmouth
Charles (1801-1860), Wellington
Charles Alfred (1848-1929), Kingsbridge
David (1790-1871), Dewesbury
David (1840-1901), Dewesbury
Dykes Alexander (1829-1905), Wellington
Edward (1749-1817), Wadebridge
Edward (1789-1845), Wellington
Edward Bonville (1886-1944), Plymouth
Francis (1765-1812), Plymouth
Francis (1772-1815), Parr
Francis (1797-1862), Wadebridge
Francis Edward (1834-1914), Tottenham
Francis William (1841-1914), Kingsbridge
Frederick (1798-1830), Falmouth
Frederick Hingston (1825-1910), Wadebridge
George (1746-1816), Wadebridge 
George (1796-1882), Wadebridge
George Croker (1752-1807), Falmouth
George Croker (1785-1850), Falmouth
George Edward (1826-1912), Wadebridge
George Henry (1845-1931), Falmouth
Henry (1800-1876), Wellington
Howard (1836-1922), Falmouth
James (1741/2-1819), Plymouth
John Howard (1864-1951), Wellington
Joseph Hingston (1835-1912), Kingsbridge
Joseph Howland (1833-1915), Wellington
Joshua (1792-1877), Falmouth
Nathaniel (1835-1910), Falmouth
Robert Were (1754-1818), Falmouth
Robert Were (1789-1877), Falmouth
Robert Were (1792-1872), Wadebridge
Samuel (1781-1868), Nottingham
Samuel (1794-1874), Wellington
Samuel Lindoe (1830-1862), Wellington
Sylvanus (1791-1851), Wellington
Theodore (1831-1899), Falmouth
Thomas (1747/9-1821), Wadebridge
Thomas (1786-1862), Wellington
Thomas (1828-1898), Wellington
Thomas Were (1766-1844), Falmouth
William (1746-1820), Nottingham

For more about the Quaker Foxes, see Francis Fox of St Germans and the Fox family of Falmouth.

References

2007 non-fiction books
British Quakers
Biographical dictionaries by topic
British biographical dictionaries
British Quaker texts
2007 in Christianity